GG Bond 2, also known as GG Bond and the Beanstalk (Chinese: 猪猪侠之勇闯巨人岛), is a 2014 Chinese animated adventure comedy film directed by Gu Zhibin and Lu Jinming. The film is part of the GG Bond film series, following GG Bond Hatching (2012) and followed by GG Bond Movie: Ultimate Battle (2015).

Plot 
When Fairy World residents are in trouble, they usually turn to Ready-To-Help Office for help where GG Bond, Phoebe and SDaddy have been on the go all day to deal with all sorts of trifles. GG Bond accidentally gets a treasure which was actually stolen from Titan Island by robber Jack. To get the treasure back, Jack plays some tricks which drag them all into a dangerous journey. After innumerable hardships, they finally arrive at Titan Island. However, Jack brings them another trouble that he insists to take away the Giant's goose which lays golden eggs. The Giant is furious and starts in hot pursuit. The moment they are flying away from the Titan Island, Jack smugly tells GG Bond the truth. Hearing that, GG Bond decides to help the Giant to get his goose back. And Jack deserves his penalty in the end.

Cast
Lu Shuang
Zu Qing
Chen Zhirong
Xu Jingwei

Box Office
The film has grossed US$6.67 million at the Chinese box office.

References

2010s adventure comedy films
2014 films
2014 computer-animated films
Animated adventure films
Animated comedy films
Chinese animated films
Animated films based on animated series
2014 comedy films